Thrypticus willistoni is a species of long-legged fly in the family Dolichopodidae.

References

Medeterinae
Articles created by Qbugbot
Insects described in 1890
Taxa named by William Morton Wheeler